Hampton Bays High School is a public high school located in Hampton Bays, a hamlet in the Town of Southampton in Suffolk County, New York, United States. It is the only high school operated by Hampton Bays Public Schools.

The school was originally known as Hampton Bays Junior-Senior School when it opened in 1971, serving grades seven to twelve. In 1993, the school was renamed Hampton Bays Secondary School until 2008, when it reverted to a high school with the opening of a middle school in the district, with grades seven and eight moving to the new campus.

References

Public high schools in New York (state)
Schools in Suffolk County, New York